Palaeococcus ferrophilus is a barophilic, hyperthermophilic archaeon from a deep-sea hydrothermal vent chimney. It cells are irregular cocci and motile with multiple polar flagella.

Paleococcus was the third genus within Euryarchaeota to be described in the literature.  These organisms prefer to use elemental sulfur as an electron acceptor, but they can also use ferrous oxide.

References

Further reading

External links
Type strain of Palaeococcus ferrophilus at BacDive -  the Bacterial Diversity Metadatabase

Euryarchaeota
Archaea described in 2000